Pop's Pop's is an arcade game by South Korean studio Afega launched in 1999. The game is a music quiz.

Gameplay 
The goal of the game is to retrieve the title of a song. When the game is launched, the player can select a beginner or mania level. Next a spinning wheel is shown. The player has to press the "stop"-button and the wheel will slow down. When it stops, it is known how many points the player will get if he can guess a letter which is somewhere in the title.

On next screen the player gets the name of the singer/group of which he must find the title. The number of words and the number of characters for every word are also shown in a similar way as in the game Wheel of Fortune. At the bottom of the screen is the alphabet. The user can select any of the 26 characters. When he selects a letter which is indeed in the title, all those positions are revealed. The user gets a temporary score where the amount of found letters are multiplied with the score defined in previous screen. The user can then select another letter. If it's in the title, a similar score calculation is done and then doubled. If the user then guesses another correct letter, the score calculation is tripled...  In case a wrong letter is selected, the score is reset to 0 points and the spinning wheel appears.

The game is ended when the user selected three letters which are not in the title. It is also finished once the title has been guessed. The only way to have a score is to guess the title.

Technical details 
The arcade machine uses a Motorola MC68000 and Zilog Z80 processor. Sound is produced by Yamaha YM2151 and OKI MSM6295. The video uses 256 * 224 5H.

References

Arcade video games
Arcade-only video games
1999 video games
Quiz video games
Video games developed in South Korea